Edmund Joseph Dobbin (November 20, 1935 – March 8, 2015) was a Roman Catholic priest of the Order of Saint Augustine (OSA, ordained 1962), and 31st president of Villanova University from 1988 to 2006. Raised in Brooklyn and Staten Island, New York, he became a noted educator in theology and mathematics, and Villanova's longest-serving president.

According to Villanova's statement announcing his death: "During his tenure as President, he heightened awareness of the Augustinian character of the University, significantly increased the school's endowment, and embarked on an expansion of the campus, its facilities, and its programs." The Philadelphia Inquirer added: "During Father Dobbin's tenure, Villanova basketball went national. He envisioned basketball as a way to help Villanova appear on the national stage."

References

1935 births
2015 deaths
Presidents of Villanova University
Catholic University of America alumni
Université catholique de Louvain alumni
Villanova University alumni
Augustinian canons
20th-century American Roman Catholic priests
21st-century American Roman Catholic priests
People from Brooklyn
People from Staten Island
Catholics from New York (state)